Christian Oliver (born 3 March 1975) is a German actor.

Oliver was born in Celle and grew up in Frankfurt am Main. He relocated to the United States to work as a model and subsequently took acting lessons in New York and Los Angeles. From 2002 until 2004, Oliver co-starred in 28 episodes of the German action TV series Alarm für Cobra 11.

Filmography
 Saved by the Bell: The New Class (1994–1995) - Brian Keller
 The Baby Sitters Club (1995) - Luca
 Two Sisters (1997) - Tim
 Eat Your Heart Out (1997) - Daniel Haus
  (1999) - Kalle
 Romantic Fighter (1999) - Dennis
 Schlaf mit meinem Mann (2001) - Benny
 Kept (2001) - Kyle
 Ablaze (2001) - Tim Vester
 A Light in the Forest (2002) - Gabriel Brown
 Frostbite (2004) - Hans
 Alarm für Cobra 11 – Die Autobahnpolizei (2002–2004) - Jan Richter
 Subject Two (2005) - Adam Schmidt
 The Good German (2006) - Emil Brandt
 Speed Racer (2008) - Snake Oiler
 Watercolors (2008) - High School Student
 Valkyrie (2009) - Sergeant-Major Adam
 Ready or Not (2009) - Chris
 Tribute (2009) - Steve Chensky (based on the novel by Nora Roberts)
 The Three Musketeers (2011) - Venetian Nobleman
 House of Good and Evil (2013) - Chris Conley
 Ninja Apocalypse (2014) - Cage
 Hercules Reborn (2014) - Arius
 Zipper (2015) - Max (uncredited)
 Sense8 (2015) - Steiner
  (2015) - Ulrich Hemberger
 Timeless (2016) - Wernher von Braun
 Best Christmas Ball Ever (2019) - Lukas
 Hunters (2020) - Wilhelm Zuchs

Own productions
 Subject Two
 Ready or not

References

External links
 
 

1972 births
Living people
People from Celle
Actors from Frankfurt
German male film actors
German male television actors